10/4 may refer to:
October 4 (month-day date notation)
April 10 (day-month date notation)
10 shillings and 4 pence in UK predecimal currency

See also
104 (disambiguation)
4/10 (disambiguation)